

The Junipers were a psychedelic pop band based in Leicester in the 2000s. Their last recording was released in 2013.

History
The Junipers formed in Leicester in 2000, and recorded and released their debut album Cut Your Key in 2008. The album was self-produced and mainly recorded at The Junipers own studio in Leicester. Three singles were pulled from the album, "Callooh Callay!", "Gordie Can't Swim" and "So the Feeling Looms"/"Out My Pocket".

The new band began recording their follow up to Cut Your Key later that year.

The Junipers second album Paint the Ground was released in 2012.

Their more recent releases include The Juniper's Euphonious Trolley - EP 1 which they described as a "poppy side project". This came out in November 2013, receiving a top review in Shindig! magazine.

Discography 

28/10/08 - Cut Your Key (Album) - San Remo Records
04/08/08 - "Callooh Callay!" (Single) - San Remo Records
08/12/08 - "Gordie Can't Swim" (Single) - San Remo Records
17/08/09 - "So the Feeling Looms"/"Out My Pocket" (Single) - San Remo Records
20/02/12 - Paint the Ground (Album) - Self-released
20/11/13 - The Junipers' Euphonious Trolley - EP1

References

External links
The Junipers' Euphonious Trolley - EP1 (digital release)

British pop music groups